Bonita Falls are a set of waterfalls in the San Bernardino National Forest, formed by Bonita Creek, that is said to be 370 or 400 feet (113 or 122 meters) in height, but possibly up to 495 feet high because of two undocumented drops in the canyon above. It is the second tallest in the national forest, being surpassed only by  Big Falls. These two waterfalls are reputably the tallest in southern California.

Characteristics
Bonita Falls are split into three tiers, and in the canyon above are two more waterfalls. These two waterfalls are a  segmented and a  cascade. In the lower canyon, near where the creek meets South Fork Lytle Creek, the upper tier is a 195-foot cascade. Following downstream is a  slide. The final, steepest drop, Lower Bonita Falls, plunges  into the final reach of Bonita Canyon. The total height of the waterfall is  considering the upper two drops, and the total height of the actual waterfall is  not counting the upstream drops. The canyon through which the falls pass has been covered in many parts with graffiti and litter.

Seasonality and access
The falls are usually flowing year-round and the lower falls are reached via a popular, approximately  hike (each way). The trailhead for the falls is an unsigned turnout parking area along Lytle Creek Road, one mile past the Front Country Ranger Station in Lytle Creek. A National Forest Adventure Pass is required to park there and on summer weekends it can fill up early. The Adventure Pass and a map to the falls are available at the ranger station. The upper tier can also be viewed from Bonita Ranch Campground, just past the parking area, but access is on private property.

Sources

Waterfalls of California
Landforms of San Bernardino County, California
San Bernardino Mountains
San Bernardino National Forest
Protected areas of San Bernardino County, California
Tiered waterfalls